1955 Országos Bajnokság I (men's water polo) was the 49th water polo championship in Hungary. There were ten teams who played two-round match for the title.

Final list 

* M: Matches W: Win D: Drawn L: Lost G+: Goals earned G-: Goals got P: Point

2. Class 
North: 1. Bp. Szikra 24, 2. Tatabányai Bányász 14, 3. Vasas Izzó 13, 4. VL Kistext 12, 5. Csepeli Vasas 9, Esztergomi Dózsa 9, Vasas MÁVAG 2(1) point. In parentheses were the conclusion penalty points.

South: 1. Bp. Spartacus 23, 2. Vasas Csepel Autó 19, 3. Bp. Bástya VTSK 17, 4. VL Hazai Fésűs 10, 5. Szegedi Bástya 8, 6. Szegedi Dózsa 4(1), 7. Törekvés Főposta 1(1) point. In parentheses were the conclusion penalty points.

Final: Bp. Spartacus-Bp. Szikra 7:3 and 2:1

Sources 
Gyarmati Dezső: Aranykor (Hérodotosz Könyvkiadó és Értékesítő Bt., Budapest, 2002.)

1955 in water polo
1955 in Hungarian sport
Seasons in Hungarian water polo competitions